Alex Aguilar is a Spanish writer. He was born in Barcelona in 1957. A professor of Animal Biology at the University of Barcelona, his research activities have focused mainly on the study of demography, ecology and management of threatened marine species. He has published widely in academic journals and has received several prestigious awards for his scientific work.

As a writer, he is known for the novel El abrazo de Fatma and the non-fiction book Chiman on the whaling industry in Iberia.

He has also published a book called Insect Behaviour.

References

Spanish writers
1957 births
Living people
Academic staff of the University of Barcelona
Writers from Barcelona